Magnum Force is the second studio album by the American hip hop duo Heltah Skeltah. It was released on October 13, 1998, through Duck Down/Priority Records.

After the release of their acclaimed 1996 debut, Nocturnal, Rock and Ruck (who later became known as Sean Price) recorded an album titled For the People, with its crew, the Boot Camp Clik, in 1997. They followed up in 1998 with their second full-length, which received harsh reviews, and accusations of the duo toning down its content to receive more sales. The album is the first solo BCC album to feature no production work from Da Beatminerz and second overall after For the People. Despite the success of the single "I Ain't Havin' That", the album received mediocre sales, which led the duo to a temporary break up.

Track listing

Charts

References

External links

1998 albums
Heltah Skeltah albums
Duck Down Music albums
Priority Records albums
Albums produced by Daz Dillinger